Loved by Few, Hated by Many is the eleventh solo studio album (and mainstream debut) by American rapper Lil' Keke from Houston, Texas. After being delayed for more than two years, it was released on November 18, 2008 through TF Records and Universal Motown Records.

The album includes the singles "I'm a G" featuring Birdman, "Money in the City" featuring Slim Thug, Paul Wall & Tre Virdure, "What It's Made For" and "She Love Gangstas".

Track listing

Chart positions

References

External links

 

2008 albums
Lil' Keke albums
Albums produced by Bangladesh (record producer)